Erasme (French) or Erasmus (Dutch) metro station is the western terminus of line 5 on the Brussels Metro. It is located in the municipality of Anderlecht, in the western part of Brussels, Belgium. It lies at grade and has a single island platform, which can be reached through tunnels under the tracks. 

The station opened on 15 September 2003 as part of the extension of former line 1B including the stations La Roue/Het Rad, CERIA/COOVI and Eddy Merckx. It was designed by Philippe Samyn and Partners and is named after Erasmus Hospital which it serves. Following the reorganisation of the Brussels Metro on 4 April 2009, it is served by line 5.

External links

Brussels metro stations
Railway stations opened in 2003
Anderlecht